The leopard skate (Rajella leopardus) is a species of fish in the family Rajidae. It is found in Namibia and South Africa. Its natural habitat is open seas.

References

Rajella
Taxonomy articles created by Polbot
Fish described in 1923
Taxobox binomials not recognized by IUCN